Burns Tracy Walling (February 4, 1855 – May 12, 1938) was a United States Naval officer from June 20, 1876, to June 30, 1911. During and immediately after World War I he served as Inspector of Engineering and Ordnance Material in Boston, Massachusetts.

After serving in several assignments, including conduct of a survey of the Pacific Coast of Mexico and Central America, Walling served as an instructor in the department of physics and chemistry at the United States Naval Academy from December 1886 until September 1892. He was inspector of ordnance and equipment for the reconstruction of the three gunboats raised by Admiral George Dewey after the Battle of Manila Bay during the Spanish–American War. In May, 1904, Walling began duty as commandant of the U. S. Naval Station, Culebra, Puerto Rico. He was the first captain of the USS Birmingham (CL-2) from April 11, 1908, to May 9, 1909, and Captain of the Yard at Naval Station New York from May 9, 1909, to October 28, 1909. Just before his retirement, from August 6, 1910, to June 30, 1911, when he retired at the grade of commodore, he commanded Naval Station, San Juan, Puerto Rico.

When President Woodrow Wilson requested that a Joint session of the United States Congress declare war on the German Empire and Congress approved the declaration on April 2, 1917, and the United States entered World War I, Walling returned to duty as Inspector of Engineering and Ordnance Material at Boston, Massachusetts until November 18, 1919. He was relieved of all duty on November 20, 1920.

Early life 

Burns Tracy Walling was born February 4, 1855, at Coshocton, Ohio. His parents were Ansel Tracy Walling, a doctor, printer, newspaperman, lawyer, Ohio state legislator and one-term member of the United States House of Representatives from Ohio (March 4, 1875 – March 3, 1877), and Sarah Ellen Burns Walling. In 1863, the family relocated to Circleville, Ohio.

Walling graduated from the United States Naval Academy in June 1876 ranked fourth in a class of 42 midshipmen.

U.S. Navy assignments

1876–1898 

After graduation from the U.S. Naval Academy, in December 1876, Midshipman Walling was assigned to the newly commissioned USS Vandalia, stationed in the Mediterranean Sea. He was promoted to the grade of ensign in September 1877. He remained on the "Vandalia" until it returned to Boston in January 1879.

Ensign Walling was assigned to the USS Powhatan, which was the flagship of the North Atlantic Squadron, from June, 1879 until June 1881. In November, 1881, Walling was assigned to the USS Ranger, in the Pacific Squadron. On the Ranger, he worked on the survey of the Pacific Coast of Mexico and Central America between Mazatlan, Mexico and Panama. In September 1884, Walling was promoted to the grade of lieutenant, junior grade.

From February 1885 to March 1886, Lieutenant Walling was assigned to the U. S. receiving ship USS Vermont at the New York Navy Yard, for recruiting duty. In April 1886, he was assigned to the U. S. Coast Survey schooner Scoresby. On the "Scoresby", he was senior assistant for the survey of natural oyster beds and instruction in oyster culture for the State of North Carolina.

From September 1886 to June 1887, Walling served on the USS Essex which was sent to the Asiatic Squadron. In June, 1887, he joined the USS Brooklyn, flagship of the Asiatic Squadron, where he served until August 1888 when he was transferred back to the Essex, which returned to New York in April, 1889.

In August, 1889, Walling was again ordered to recruiting duty on the Vermont, at the New York Navy Yard.

From December 1886 until September 1892, Walling was an instructor in the department of physics and chemistry at the U. S. Naval Academy. In March, 1890, he was promoted to the grade of lieutenant. In September, 1892, he was assigned for instruction at the U. S. Naval War College at Newport, Rhode Island.

In December, 1892, Lieutenant Walling joined the USS Kearsarge, which had sunk the Confederate States Navy cruiser CSS Alabama at the Battle of Cherbourg off Cherbourg, France, on June 19, 1864. He was detached for automobile torpedo instruction at the War College at Newport in July, 1893. He returned to the "Kearsarge" in August. On the February 2, 1894, Lieutenant Walling was aboard the "Kearsarge" along with 202 other officers and men, including the admiral commanding the North Atlantic Station, when the ship was wrecked on Roncador Cay in the western Caribbean Sea off Venezuela. In April 1895, Walling was assigned to the USS Atlanta in the North Atlantic Squadron until the ship was decommissioned in September, 1895.

In November, 1895, Walling again was assigned to the U. S. receiving ship Vermont, for recruiting duty. In September 1896, he was detached for duty as electrical assistant in the equipment department of the New York Navy Yard.

In September, 1897, Walling was ordered to serve as navigator of the USS Wheeling in the Pacific Squadron off Alaska, Walling was hospitalized in April, 1898. In September, 1898, he was again assigned as electrical assistant in the equipment department at the New York Navy Yard.

Spanish–American War and aftermath 
Lieutenant Walling was promoted to lieutenant commander in March 1899. In June 1899, he took a detachment of officers and men on board the U. S. transport USS Solace for duty in the Philippines. Upon arriving at Manila in August 1899, Walling was sent to Hong Kong by the commander-in-chief of the Asiatic Squadron to serve as inspector of ordnance and equipment for the reconstruction of the three gunboats raised by Admiral George Dewey after the Battle of Manila Bay during the Spanish–American War. In March 1900, Walling was ordered to the U.S. Naval Station at Cavite, Philippines, to organize the equipment department and construct shops at that station.

Later commands and assignments 

After returning from the Philippines, in June, 1901, Walling served as executive officer on the USS Albany, in the Mediterranean Sea. He returned to the United States in July, 1902. In August 1902, Walling became general assistant in the equipment department of the New York Navy Yard.

In May, 1904, Walling began duty as commandant of the U. S. Naval Station, Culebra, Puerto Rico, and as commanding officer of the USS Gloucester and USS Alliance. In December, 1905, Walling was promoted to commander.

In December 1906, Commander Walling became equipment officer of the New York Navy Yard and general inspector for the Bureau of Equipment of the United States Department of the Navy, Washington, D.C., for vessels being built at private shipyards on the Atlantic Coast.

Walling was the first captain of the USS Birmingham from April 11, 1908, to May 9, 1909.

Walling was Captain of the Yard at Naval Station New York from May 9, 1909, to October 28, 1909.

From August 6, 1910, until his retirement on June 11, 1911, Walling was commandant of Naval Station, San Juan, Puerto Rico.

Walling retired June 30, 1911, at the grade of commodore.

World War I 

At the outset of United States involvement in World War I on April 2, 1917, Walling returned to duty as Inspector of Engineering and Ordnance Material at Boston, Massachusetts until November 18, 1919. He was relieved of all duty on November 20, 1920.

Author 

In 1907, Walling wrote a manual on Electrical Installations of the United States Navy.

Personal life 

Walling was married on October 27, 1892, to Wilhelmina Boyd, daughter of a U. S. Navy captain, at Grace Church, Brooklyn, New York. The Wallings had two daughters, Grace, who married U.S. Navy Commander James Sutherland Spore and a younger sister, Bernice.

Death 

Burns Tracy Walling died on May 12, 1938, at Los Angeles, California. He is buried in Arlington National Cemetery.

Notes

References 
 Congressional Serial Set. Washington, DC: Government Printing Office, 1911. Retrieved January 6, 1911.
 Newspaper: Brooklyn Life, Brooklyn Life from Brooklyn, New York, April 15, 1916, Page 12. Retrieved January 6, 2016.
 United States Bureau of Naval Personnel. Register of Commissioned and Warrant Officers of the United States Navy and Marine Corps and Reserve Officers on Active Duty. Washington, DC: United States Navy Department, 1910. Retrieved January 6, 2016.
 Register of Commissioned and Warrant Officers of the United States Navy and Marine Corps and Reserve Officers on Active Duty Washington, DC: United States Navy Department, 1913.. Retrieved January 6, 2016.
 Navy Directory: Officers of the United States Navy and Marine Corps, Also Including Officers of the United States Naval Reserve, Active, Marine Corps Reserve, Active, and Foreign Officers Serving with the Navy. United States Navy Dept. Bureau of Navigation: U.S. Government Printing Office, 1919. Retrieved January 6, 2016.
 United States Navy, Naval History & Heritage Command Birmingham I (Scout Cruiser No. 2). Retrieved January 6, 2016.
 Van Cleaf, Aaron R. History of Pickaway County, Ohio, and Representative Citizens. Chicago: Biographical Publishing Company, 1906. . Retrieved January 5, 2016.
 Walling, Burns T. and Julius Martin Electrical Installations of the United States Navy. Annapolis, MD: Naval Institute Press, 1907. . Retrieved January 6, 2016.

1855 births
1938 deaths
United States Naval Academy alumni
American military personnel of the Spanish–American War
United States Navy commodores
Burials at Arlington National Cemetery
People from Coshocton, Ohio